Holly Cram (born 30 April 1984) is a female field hockey forward from Scotland. She won 140 caps playing for the Women's National Team.

Cram was born in Glasgow and went to school at Glasgow Academy. She studied at the University of Edinburgh, graduating with an honours degree in literature. She then completed a Postgraduate Diploma in Physical Education at the University of Strathclyde.

She reached the 100 cap mark by August 2011. She played club hockey for Glasgow Western.

Cram is a Game On Scotland ambassador for Glasgow 2014.

She works as a hockey coach at Dollar Academy in Clackmannanshire.

References

External links
 Profile on Scottish hockey

1984 births
Living people
Scottish female field hockey players
Field hockey players at the 2010 Commonwealth Games
Field hockey players from Glasgow
People educated at the Glasgow Academy
Alumni of the University of Edinburgh
Commonwealth Games competitors for Scotland